Saare was a rural municipality of Estonia, in Jõgeva County. It had a population of 1,391 (2007) and an area of 224.7 km².

Villages
Saare Parish had 22 villages: Halliku (54), Jaama (70), Kääpa (206), Kallivere (27), Kiisli (33), Koseveski (46), Levala (32), Maardla (37), Nautrasi (20), Odivere (82), Pällu (63), Pedassaare (15), Putu (52), Ruskavere (59), Saarjärve (33), Sirguvere (48), Tarakvere (15), Tuulavere (20), Vanassaare (46), Vassevere (45), Veia (47), Voore (341).

References

External links